Wangaratta High School is a secondary education institution in Wangaratta, Victoria, Australia.  It was the 2002 winner of the Kool Skools award. It has consolidated from three campuses (Ovens College and the Wangaratta HS / GoTAFE Campus), back to one campus in 2014.  

The Senior Years Learning Community, housing students in Years 10 - 12 is a state of the art building powered by geothermal energy.  It was completed in 2009 along with the refurbishment of the PAC (Performing Arts Centre).  A new administrative office and Science / Technology and Arts building was completed in 2013.  The Middle Years Learning Community, housing students in Years 7 - 9 has also been. Future plans include demolition of the 'old' buildings on the Edwards street site; refurbishment of the current Year 7 Learning Community (old library) into the Wellbeing Precinct as well as a new sports centre and double gym.
The school has a strong reputation in outdoor education, adventure and skiing. It has a long association with Mittagundi Outdoor Education Centre, and a number of  Directors/Principals have been past students. The school has previously won the Victorian Interschools Cross Country Skiing Championships, and a number of alumni have represented Australia in cross-country skiing, including Xanthea Dewez 

Extracurricular activities include involvement in the schools many bands, each of which go on a camp each year, to various parts of Australia. In 2022, Wangaratta High School was a premium venue of the Wangaratta Jazz and Blues Festival

Notable alumni
Nick Cave, musician
Jenny Macklin, Australian politician
Mette-Marit, Crown Princess of Norway
Darcy Vescio, AFLW footballer
Krsytal De Napoli, Gomeroi Astrophysicist and author

References

External links
Homepage
Celebrate! : the first 100 years of Wangaratta High School, 1909-2009

Secondary schools in Victoria (Australia)
Wangaratta
Educational institutions established in 1909
1909 establishments in Australia